The Social Affairs and Health Committee of the Economic, Social and Cultural Council for the African Union is responsible for:

 Health
 Children
 Drug control
 Population
 Migration
 Labor and employment
 Family
 Aging
 The physically challenged
 Sports
 Youth and protection
 Social integration

The Chairperson of the Committee is Helder Francisco Malauene

Sectoral Cluster Committees of the Economic, Social and Cultural Council
Health in Africa

Parliamentary committees on Healthcare